Chara braunii is one of only several ecorticated species of the genus Chara occurring in Europe and the only species without cortication known from Poland. Chara braunii is the first Charophyceae for which the whole nuclear genome has been sequenced and published.

The findings of C. braunii in southern Poland only in fish ponds may have suggested that this species is restricted only to this type of ecosystem, but this is not true.

Description

The plant is small to medium size.
Fresh green to brownish green when found in the muddy bottom.
Transparent and richly branched. Plants are entirely ecorticate (i.e., without cortex). 
The main axis slender up to 1200 µm in diameter. 
The stipulodes (single cell organs present in one or more rows in the branchlets of Chara) occur in a single whorl and are well developed. 
Branchlets 6-10 in a whorl, straight and occasionally incurved; segments 4-6, the last one often reduced, with 1 or more small end cells forming tiny terminal corona. 
Bracteoles (leaf-like structures) slightly longer than the oospore. 
The species is monoecious and richly fertile
oogonia are situated above the antheridia. 
The oospore is dark brown or black.

Distribution
The species have a cosmopolitan distribution between 65 deg. N and 35 deg. S.

Ch. braunii has been placed on a “red” list of endangered algae in Poland in the category “indeterminate”, but probably simply because of poor investigation of the species in Poland.

In Poland, the species was found exclusively in fish ponds, and it was suggested that C. braunii is limited to only this kind of ecosystem. However findings in other parts of the world  show that this is not true.

References

External links

Charophyta